This is a list of official symbols of Puerto Rico.

Symbol or Emblem

Puerto Rico does not have an official bird. In 2001 the legislature passed a bill designating the pitirre (Tyrannus dominicensis), but the governor vetoed the bill because it is not endemic to Puerto Rico.

See also

Governors of Puerto Rico

References

Symbols
Puerto Rico